Adam Byrne (born 20 April 1994) is an Irish rugby union player for Connacht Rugby. His preferred position is on the wing, although he also plays at full-back. His brother Sam is a professional football player.

Leinster career 
Byrne made his Leinster senior debut on 29 December 2012 at the age of just 18, making him the youngest ever player to play for Leinster. In the interim, Byrne played for the Leinster A side, which won back to back British & Irish Cup trophies, before fully emerging into the Leinster squad in 2015-16, whilst still a member of the academy. Byrne opened his scoring account for Leinster by crossing the whitewash on only his second ever start, versus Zebre on 12 February 2016.
Byrne was awarded a senior development contract with the province to commence in the 2016-17 season.

Connacht career 
It was announced in March 2022 that Byrne had signed for Connacht alongside teammates Peter Dooley and Josh Murphy for 2022/2023 season.

National team 
In 2015 and 2016, Byrne played with the Ireland national rugby sevens team, which aims to be a permanent national team. He played different sevens championships to gain promotion to the 2017 Grand Prix Series. He also played the Olympic qualification tournament, but Ireland failed to qualify for the 2016 Olympics after a defeat against Spain in Cup quarter final (12-7).

On 26 October 2017, Byrne was named in the extended Ireland national rugby union team for the Autumn internationals. He made his debut against Argentina on 25 November 2017, starting as a winger and ending the game as a center.

References

External links
Leinster Profile
Pro14 Profile

Ireland Profile

Irish rugby union players
1994 births
Living people
Rugby union wings
Leinster Rugby players
Ireland international rugby sevens players
Alumni of University College Dublin
Rugby union players from County Kildare
Ireland international rugby union players
Connacht Rugby players